The legislative district of Mindoro was the representation of the historical province of Mindoro in the various national legislatures of the Philippines until 1951. The undivided province's representation encompassed the present-day provinces of Occidental Mindoro and Oriental Mindoro.

History
Mindoro initially comprised a lone district for the purposes of electing representatives to the First Philippine Assembly in 1907. When seats for the upper house of the Philippine Legislature were elected from territory-based districts between 1916 and 1935, the province formed part of the fifthsenatorial district which elected two out of the 24-member Senate.

During the Second World War, two delegates represented Surigao in the National Assembly of the Japanese-sponsored Second Philippine Republic: one was the provincial governor (an ex officio member), while the other was elected through a provincial assembly of KALIBAPI members during the Japanese occupation of the Philippines. Upon the restoration of the Philippine Commonwealth in 1945, the province continued to constitute a single representative district.

The enactment of Republic Act No. 505 on 13 June 1950 split Mindoro into Occidental Mindoro and Oriental Mindoro, and provided each province separate representation in Congress. Pursuant to Section 6 of R.A. 505, the incumbent representative of Mindoro began to represent only Oriental Mindoro in the second half of the 2nd Congress, following the election of Occidental Mindoro's separate representative in a special election held on the same day as the 1951 senatorial elections.

Lone District (defunct)

 Resigned on 1 March 1914. 
 Assumed office after winning special election held on 8 June 1914; served for the remainder of the 3rd Legislature. 
 Died on 23 April 1932. 
 Assumed office after winning special election held on 4 June 1932; served for the remainder of the 9th Legislature. 
 Elected in 1949 as representative of Mindoro Province; began to serve as the representative of Oriental Mindoro beginning in the second half of the 2nd Congress, after the election of a separate representative for Occidental Mindoro in 1951, pursuant to R.A. 505.

At-Large (defunct)

See also
Legislative district of Occidental Mindoro
Legislative district of Oriental Mindoro

References

Mindoro
Mindoro